Eristparcula is a genus of moths belonging to the family Tortricidae.

Species
Eristparcula brunniuba Razowski & Becker, 2001
Eristparcula ochriuba Razowski & Becker, 2001

See also
List of Tortricidae genera

References

 , 2001, SHILAP revista de lepidopterologia 29: 379.
 , 2005, World Catalogue of Insects 5

External links
tortricidae.com

Euliini
Tortricidae genera